Leonora Christina can mean:
 Leonora Christina Ulfeldt (1621-1698), Danish author of Jammers Minde
 Leonora Christina (ship), a ferry of BornholmerFærgen which is called after Leonora Christina Ulfeldt